Buckeye Creek is a stream in northern Cape Girardeau County in the U.S. state of Missouri. It is a tributary of Apple Creek.

The stream headwaters arise just west of I-55 and south of Missouri Route E approximately two miles east of Oak Ridge (at ) at an elevation of 600 feet. The stream flows north to northeast passing under I-55 and U.S. Route 61 west of Shawneetown. Its confluence with Apple Creek is approximately two miles east of Old Appleton (at ) at an elevation of 361 feet.

Buckeye Creek was named for the buckeye trees lining its course.

See also
List of rivers of Missouri

References

Rivers of Cape Girardeau County, Missouri
Rivers of Missouri